Kwara State College of Education, Ilorin was established in September 1974 by the Kwara State Government. The College is located in the ancient city of Ilorin, the capital of Kwara State.

History 
The College started as School of Education and was administered by the then Kwara State College of Technology (now Kwara State Polytechnic). The College was subsequently changed to an Advanced Teachers' College. By 1976, the College was completely detached from Kwara College of Technology and formally named Kwara State College of Education to be sited in Oro. The College moved to a temporary site in Ilorin and was affiliated to Ahmadu Bello University, Zaria. At the College's 1980 convocation, the then Governor of Kwara State, Alhaji Adamu Attah declared that the College will remain in Ilorin. It was then re-affiliated to the University of Ilorin.

Governing Council and Management 
The Governing Council of the institution is the policy making organ of the college. It is headed by a Chairman and other members are drawn from different sectors of the society. Besides the governing council, the College also has management which runs the College. The management is headed by a Provost. The current provost is Prof AbdulRaheem Yusuf.

Staffing 
The College which is a teacher training College of Education  started with 13 staff. The College now has hundreds of academic and non-academic staff.

Academic Programmes 
The College runs the following academic programmes:
Pre-NCE
NCE. The College was temporarily stopped by the state government from admitting NCE students. That decision has been reversed
Regular Degree (B.A. Ed, B.Ed) in Affiliation with Ekiti State University
Sandwich Degree (B.A Ed, B.Ed) in Affiliation with Ekiti State University
Diploma in Computer Science
Certificate in Computer Science
P.D.E (Professional Diploma in Education)
Diploma in the Teaching of Arabic and Islamic Studies
Diploma in the Teaching of Christian Religious Studies
I.J.M.B in Affiliation with Ahmadu Bello University, Zaria.

References

Universities and colleges in Nigeria
Ilorin
Educational institutions established in 1974
1974 establishments in Nigeria